Eadric (died August 686/ 687?) was a King of Kent (685–686). He was the son of Ecgberht I.

Historical context

In the 7th century the Kingdom of Kent had been politically stable for some time. According to Bede:

Eorcenberht was succeeded by his sons Ecgberht (664-673) and Hlothhere (673-685). Ecgberht's court seems to have had many diplomatic and ecclesiastic contacts. He hosted Wilfrid and Benedict Biscop, and provided escorts to Archbishop Theodore and Abbot Adrian of Canterbury for their travels in Gaul. However, increasing dynastic tensions occurred at this time, when according to tradition Ecgberht had his cousins Æthelred and Æthelberht murdered, effectively removing them as they had a strong claim on the throne.

Joint ruler of Kent?
Hlothhere succeeded his brother as ruler of Kent in 673. It was not unusual for Kent to be divided between rulers at that time. However although there has been some suggestion that Eadric jointly ruled with his uncle Hlothhere, there is no certain evidence for it. The Law of Hlothhere and Eadric is a single law code that was issued in the name of Hlothhere and Eadric as joint rulers of Kent, but it may just have been a conflation of two earlier separate codes.

In 679 Hlothhere granted land in Thanet to Beorhtwald, abbot of Reculver. In the charter document there is a statement noting the agreement of Archbishop Theodore and "Eadric, son of my brother".

Sole ruler
The charter of 679 implies that, at that date, the relationship between Eadric and his uncle were not unfriendly, however in about 685 Eadric revolted against his uncle. With help from Æthelwealh of Sussex he raised a South Saxon army and defeated Hlothhere in battle. Hlothhere died of his wounds shortly after and  Eadric became sole ruler of Kent. 

Eadric was a nephew of Wulfhere of Mercia. Wulfhere was in an alliance with the South Saxons, so it would have served the politics of the time for Æthelwealh to support Eadric's coup against Hlothhere.

Invaded by Wessex
Also, in 685  a West Saxon warband invaded Sussex under  the command of the Wessex prince Cædwalla and killed Æthelwealh. Cædwalla was subsequently driven out of Sussex by two of Æthelwealh's ealdormen, Berhthun and Andhun.
William of Malmesbury suggests that Eadric  became king of the South Saxon kingdom at that time. Then in 686,  Cædwalla, now king of Wessex, and his brother Mul, removed Eadric from power  and made Mul king of Kent. 

There is a discussion on the actual date of Eadric's death.
Bede lists his death, but does not provide a precise date,  however one of the Kent annals, suggest that he was buried on 31 August 686 and  another 31 August 687.

See also
List of monarchs of Kent

Notes

Citations

References

External links

Anglo-Saxon warriors
Kentish monarchs
686 deaths
7th-century English monarchs
Year of birth unknown